Prison 21 may refer to:
Cárcel la 21 in León, Nicaragua
 Security Prison 21, now the Tuol Sleng Genocide Museum in Phnom Penh